Mayu Tsukamoto (born 15 April 1997) is a Japanese synchronized swimmer. She competed in the 2020 Summer Olympics.

She also participated at the 2018 Asian Games and won a silver medal in the team event.

References

1997 births
Living people
Japanese synchronized swimmers
Synchronized swimmers at the 2020 Summer Olympics
Olympic synchronized swimmers of Japan
Medalists at the 2018 Asian Games
Artistic swimmers at the 2018 Asian Games
Asian Games medalists in artistic swimming
Asian Games silver medalists for Japan